Susan Dorothy Geason (born 1946) is an Australian writer of fiction and non-fiction for adults and teenagers.

Born in New Norfolk, Tasmania, to Urban James and Joan Susan (née Oakford) Geason, she grew up in Queensland and graduated from the University of Queensland with a BA in History and Politics. While living in Canada, she completed a master's degree in Political Theory at the University of Toronto.

From 1979 to 1980 Geason was a Legislative Researcher in the Parliamentary Library, Canberra, and from 1980 to 1981 was education editor of The National Times.

From March 1982 to 1985 Geason was a policy officer in the Cabinet Office of the NSW Premier's Department.

From 1985 to 1987, she was head of Information and Publications with the NSW State Pollution Control Commission.

From 1991 to 1997, Geason was literary editor of The Sydney Morning Herald.

Since 1987, she has worked as a freelance writer, editor and communications consultant.

The State Library of New South Wales holds the Susan Geason papers, 1989-2001, relating to the books she was writing at that time and comprising correspondence, draft manuscripts, interview notes, book plans, news clippings, research and photographs.

Geason was awarded a PhD in creative writing by the School of English, Media Studies and Art History at the University of Queensland in 2005 for her thesis, "Under the Canopy of Heaven : Charlotte Brontë and Mary Taylor; What Mary Knew : The Relationship Between Mary Taylor and Charlotte Brontë". It was published as What Mary Knew : Mary Taylor and Charlotte Brontë in 2011.

Publications 
Adult Fiction
 Shaved Fish, Allen & Unwin, 1990, 
 Wildfire, Arrow Books/Random House, 1995, 

Crime Fiction
 Dogfish: A Syd Fish thriller, Allen & Unwin, 1991, 
 Sharkbait: A Syd Fish mystery, Allen & Unwin, 1993, 

Teenage Fiction and Non-Fiction
 Great Australian Girls and the Remarkable Women They Became, ABC Books, 1999, 
 Australian Heroines: Stories of Courage and Survival, ABC Books, 2001, 
 Death of a Princess, Little Hare Books, 2005, 
 Rebel Girl: A Tale of Friendship and Survival in Taiping China, ABC Books, 2007, 
 All Fall Down, Little Hare Books, 2005, ; Large print edition ReadHowYouWant, 2008
 Flight of the Falcon, Little Hare Books, 2006, ; Large print edition ReadHowYouWant, 2009

Non-Fiction
 Regarding Jane Eyre, (editor and contributor), Random House, 1997, 
 Pitt Water People : The Ivers, Young, Gould, Cashman and Lahey Families in Tasmania, Susan Geason, 2010, 
 What Mary Knew : Mary Taylor & Charlotte Brontë, Susan Geason, 2011, 
 People of the Plains: The Young, Gould, Cashman, Lahey, Geason and Beven Families in Tasmania, Susan Geason, 2nd ed., 2011, 
 River Folk: The Latham, Griggs, Corbett, Oakford, Darcy and O'Connor Families in Tasmania, Susan Geason, 2nd ed., 2011, 
 A Long Way from Tipperary: The Geason, Beven, Evans and Lynch Families in Tasmania, Susan Geason, 2nd ed., 2011, 

Stories in Anthologies and Magazines
 An Old Husband's Tale in More Crimes for a Summer Christmas, ed. Stephen Knight, Allen & Unwin, 1991, 
 Aint Misbehavin in Killing Women: Rewriting Detective Fiction (essays on feminism and the PI genre), ed. Delys Bird, Angus & Robertson, 1993, 
 Conflict of Interest in Moonlight Becomes You: Crimes for Summer 6, ed. Jean Bedford, Allen & Unwin, 1995, 
 Sybilla of the Fires in Overland Vol. 138, Autumn 1995
 Totally Devoted in Shadow Alley (crime for teenagers), compiled by Lucy Sussex, Omnibus Books, 1995, 
 Green Murder in Women on the Case, ed. Sara Paretsky, Delacorte, 1996, ; & Virago, 1996, 
 Geason has had stories published in Australian Penthouse, Billy Blue Magazine, The Sun-Herald, Tages Anzeiger (Zurich), Australasian PostCrime Prevention'''
 Crime Prevention: Theory and Practice, (Paul R. Wilson, co-author), Australian Institute of Criminology, 1988, 
 Designing Out Crime: Crime Prevention Through Environmental Design, (Paul R. Wilson, co-author), Australian Institute of Criminology, 1989, 
 Preventing Car Theft and Crime in Car Parks, (Paul R. Wilson, co-author), Australian Institute of Criminology, 1990, 
 Preventing Graffiti and Vandalism, (Paul R. Wilson, co-author), Australian Institute of Criminology, 1990, 
 Preventing Retail Crime'', (Paul R. Wilson, co-author), Australian Institute of Criminology, 1992,

References

External links
Author's website

1946 births
Living people
University of Queensland alumni
Australian women novelists
Australian women short story writers
20th-century Australian women writers
20th-century Australian writers
21st-century Australian women writers
21st-century Australian writers
The Sydney Morning Herald people
Australian crime fiction writers